Ghada Hassine (born 17 May 1993 in Sfax, Tunisia) is a Tunisian weightlifter. She competed at the 2012 Summer Olympics in the -69 kg event and finished tenth.

References

External links
 
 
 
 

1993 births
Living people
Tunisian female weightlifters
Olympic weightlifters of Tunisia
Weightlifters at the 2012 Summer Olympics
African Games silver medalists for Tunisia
African Games medalists in weightlifting
Mediterranean Games silver medalists for Tunisia
Mediterranean Games medalists in weightlifting
Competitors at the 2015 African Games
Competitors at the 2013 Mediterranean Games
21st-century Tunisian women